Chris Kerr may refer to:

 Chris Kerr (speedway rider) (born 1984), American speedway rider
 Chris Kerr (footballer) (born 1978), Scottish footballer
 Chris Kerr (referee) (born 1976), football referee from New Zealand